Letsie III (born Seeiso Bereng; 17 July 1963) is King of Lesotho. He succeeded his father, Moshoeshoe II, who was forced into exile in 1990. His father was briefly restored in 1995 but died in a car crash in early 1996, and Letsie became king again. As a constitutional monarch, most of King Letsie's duties as monarch of Lesotho are ceremonial. In 2000, he declared HIV/AIDS in Lesotho to be a natural disaster, prompting immediate national and international response to the epidemic.

Biography
Letsie III was born on 17 July 1963 at the Scott Hospital in Morija, a town south of the capital Maseru. He was educated in the United Kingdom at Ampleforth College. From there, he went on to study at the National University of Lesotho, where he graduated with a Bachelor of Arts Degree in Law. He then went on to study at the University of Bristol (Diploma in English Legal Studies, 1986), Wolfson College, Cambridge (Development Studies, 1989), and Wye College (Agricultural Economics). He completed his studies in 1989, when he returned to Lesotho.

He was installed as the Principal Chief of Matsieng on 16 December 1989.

His coronation took place on 31 October 1997 at Setsoto Stadium. King Charles III (then Charles, Prince of Wales) attended the ceremony.

On 1 December 2016, in Rome, King Letsie III was appointed as the Food and Agriculture Organization's newest Special Ambassador for Nutrition by the Organization's Director-General, José Graziano da Silva.

Personal life

Marriage and children
King Letsie married in 2000 to Karabo Motšoeneng, with whom he has two daughters and one son:

 Princess Mary Senate Mohato Seeiso, born 7 October 2001 at Maseru Private Hospital in Maseru.
 Princess 'Maseeiso Mohato Seeiso, born 20 November 2004 in Maseru.
 Prince Lerotholi David Mohato Bereng Seeiso, born 18 April 2007 in Maseru.

Religion
King Letsie is a Roman Catholic, the only such monarch of an African nation. He is a member of the Sacred Military Constantinian Order of Saint George and has been credited with promoting the principles of his Catholic faith in Lesotho.

Patronages
 Patron of the Prince Mohato Award (Khau ea Khosana Mohato).

Honours

National
  : Grand Master of the Most Dignified Order of Moshoeshoe.
  : Grand Master of the Most Courteous Order of Lesotho.
  : Grand Master of the Most Meritorious Order of Mohlomi.
  : Grand Master of the Most Loyal Order of Ramatseatsane.
  : Outstanding Service Medal.

Foreign
  :
  Two Sicilian Royal Family: Bailiff Knight Grand Cross of Justice of the Two Sicilian Royal Sacred Military Constantinian Order of Saint George (8 October 2013).

Ancestry

References

External links
Official Biography of King Letsie III

|-

1963 births
Living people
National University of Lesotho alumni
Alumni of the University of Bristol
Alumni of Wolfson College, Cambridge
Alumni of Wye College
20th-century Christians
20th-century monarchs in Africa
21st-century monarchs in Africa
21st-century Christians
House of Moshesh
Kings of Lesotho
Christian monarchs
Lesotho Christians
South African Christians
People educated at Ampleforth College
Monarchies of South Africa
People from Maseru District